The Austro Engine E4 (marketed as the AE 300) is a liquid-cooled, inline, four-cylinder, four-stroke, aircraft diesel engine. The engine is manufactured by Austro Engine, an Austrian-based company and subsidiary of Diamond Aircraft Industries.

Development 
The engine is based on the Mercedes-Benz OM640 road Diesel engine.

Following Diamond's "General Aviation Single Point of Contact" strategy, Austro Engine started to design a new engine for use on Diamond products in 2005. It received its type certificate in January 2009.

Applications 
Diamond DA40
Diamond DA42
Diamond DA50
Diamond DA52
Diamond DA62 180hp AE330.

Specifications (E4)

References

External links 

Austro Engine aircraft engines
Aircraft diesel engines
2000s aircraft piston engines